Philibertia is a genus of flowering plants in the family Apocynaceae, first described as a genus in 1819. It is native to South America.

Species

formerly included
moved to other genera (Blepharodon, Funastrum, Gonolobus)

References

Asclepiadoideae
Apocynaceae genera